Bartłomiej Jaszka (born 16 June 1983) is a former Polish handball player who is currently the manager of Zagłębie Lubin.

Career
He participated at the 2008 Summer Olympics, where Poland finished fifth. He was also part of the Polish team, which won the bronze medal at the 2009 World Men's Handball Championship.

References

External links
 Profile at Füchse-Berlin.de
 

1983 births
Living people
People from Ostrów Wielkopolski
Sportspeople from Greater Poland Voivodeship
Polish male handball players
Expatriate handball players
Polish expatriate sportspeople in Germany
Handball-Bundesliga players
Handball players at the 2008 Summer Olympics
Olympic handball players of Poland
Füchse Berlin Reinickendorf HBC players
Polish handball coaches
21st-century Polish people